Armageddon Tour was the 9th concert tour by Australian recording artist Guy Sebastian. The tour supported his upcoming sixth studio album Armageddon. The tour visited metropolitan and regional areas in Australia. In 2012, Sebastian announced that the title of his new album was to be Armageddon. Ahead of the album's release, Sebastian wen on a national tour.  The tour took in 20 dates across the country in both metropolitan and regional centres, kicking off in Cessnock on 1 June 2012 before finishing up on the Sunshine Coast on 1 July 2012. Sebastian toured in places he has not toured before.

Background 

Sebastian toured nationally during June and July 2012. The 20 date tour had concerts in all capital cities and also in regional areas of New South Wales, Victoria and Queensland. Originally scheduled to promote the album after its release, the tour became a showcase for the new songs. An extra concert at the Palais Theatre, Victoria was added to film footage for the deluxe edition of the album. Sebastian performed songs from previous albums as well as new songs. He felt it was the best tour he had done, saying "I pretty much put every cent back into the tour and really stepped up the production and the lighting, it's a lot bigger and better. I'm playing some 3000-seat venues and a bunch of them are sold out, so I want to make sure I'm not compromising. I didn't want to fall short, and it has come up great, better than I thought."

Sebastian invited Ben Burgess, a musician friend from the US, to tour with him. He performed Fiasco's rap on "Battle Scars" and was also the support act. Due to Carmen Smith's disqualification from The Voice she was able to participate on the tour. She performed backing vocals along with Gary Pinto, and also the featured parts for "Art of Love" and "Who's That Girl". Smith also performed "Armageddon" with Sebastian, as at the time he had been thinking of having a featured artist on the track. There was speculation in the media that Channel Nine's The Voice had issues with Sebastian, when The Voice contestants including his own brother Chris were barred from attending one of the concerts. Sebastian is a judge and mentor on The X Factor which is aired on the Seven Network. Channel Nine blamed it on scheduling and security problems, while the show's producers declined to comment.

Tour dates

References 

2012 concert tours